DLF may refer to:
DLF (seed company) DLF is a global seed company headquartered in Roskilde, Denmark. The company provides quality products to more than 80 countries worldwide.
Darfur Liberation Front
David Lynch Foundation, a charitable foundation based in Fairfield, Iowa, which operates throughout the world
Deed in lieu of foreclosure, a deed instrument in which a mortgagor conveys all interest in a real property to the mortgagee to satisfy a loan that is in default and avoid foreclosure proceedings
Derby Lunatic Fringe a football hooligan firm based in Derby, England
Destination Lookup Failure
Deutschlandfunk, a German public broadcasting radio station
Development Loan Fund, former lending arm of the U.S. International Cooperation Administration
Dhofar Liberation Front, a Marxist movement based in southern Oman
Digital Library Federation, an international consortium of libraries and related agencies that are pioneering the use of electronic-information technologies to extend collections and services
Disabled Living Foundation, a non-profit organisation based in the United Kingdom that provides advice on disability issues for older and disabled people
DLF (company), India's largest real estate firm, formerly known as Delhi Land and Finance
France Arise (Debout la France), a French political party founded by Nicolas Dupont-Aignan
Liberal People's Party (Norway, 1972), a defunct political party (1972–1988)
Liberal People's Party (Norway), a political party created in 1992
D Language Foundation, nonprofit organization devoted to the D programming language